Cameron Hargreaves (born 1 December 1998) is an English professional footballer who plays as a midfielder for National League North club King's Lynn Town.

Career

Exeter City 
Hargreaves began his career in the youth academy at Exeter City. He was released by the club in May 2017.

Bristol Rovers 
In April 2017, Hargreaves agreed terms to join Bristol Rovers upon the expiration of his contract with Exeter City. In July 2017, he joined the first team during a pre-season camp in Portugal.

On 29 August 2017, he made his professional debut replacing Liam Sercombe in the 83rd minute of a 5–1 EFL Trophy victory against Wycombe Wanderers. On 31 October, he replaced Ryan Broom in the 66th minute of a 3–1 defeat to West Ham United Under-23s in the same competition. On 29 November 2018, Hargreaves was loaned out to Hungerford Town for the rest of 2018. The deal was later extended for the rest of the season.

At the end of the 2018–19 season, Bristol Rovers exercised a contract extension for him.

Hargreaves made his first league appearance for the club in a 1–0 victory over Milton Keynes Dons, replacing Ed Upson in the 75th minute of the match and made his full league debut for the club in a 0–0 draw with Fleetwood Town on 29 December 2019, playing 84 minutes before being substituted.

On 3 June 2020, Hargreaves signed a new two-year extension to his contract after having a breakthrough season.

On 12 November 2021, Hargreaves, along with his Rovers teammate Zain Walker, joined National League South side Chippenham Town on loan. On 9 December, this loan deal was extended by a month.

On 5 February 2022, Hargreaves joined National League side King's Lynn Town on a one-month loan deal. Hargreaves was released by Rovers at the end of the 2021–22 season.

King's Lynn Town
On 30 June 2022, Hargreaves returned to King's Lynn Town on a one-year deal for the upcoming National League North season following their relegation the previous season.

Personal life
He is the son of Chris Hargreaves, the former Bristol Rovers' Academy Manager and former professional footballer who was most recently manager of Yeovil Town.

Career statistics

References

Living people
1998 births
English footballers
Exeter City F.C. players
Bristol Rovers F.C. players
Hungerford Town F.C. players
Chippenham Town F.C. players
King's Lynn Town F.C. players
National League (English football) players
English Football League players
Association football midfielders